(born 9 August 1935) is a Japanese film actress and voice actress essayist.

Biography

Early life
Kazuko was born in Tokyo as a first daughter of Eisuke Yoshiyuki, a writer, and Aguri. She has an older brother, Junnosuke Yoshiyuki, a novelist, and a sister, Rie Yoshiyuki, a poet. A lifelong sufferer of asthma since she was two years old, she was frequently taken as a child to Okayama, where her grandparents lived, for a change of air. She graduated from Joshigakuen Girls High school in Tokyo in 1954.

Career
She started her career as an actress with theatre troupe Gekidan Mingei in 1955, appearing in the role of Sophie in Junji Kinoshita's A Japanese Called Otto in 1966. Her major breakthrough on the stage came when she played Anne Frank in The Diary of a Young Girl in 1977.

She made her debut on the screen in 1955 and has appeared in more than 60 films since then. She won Best Supporting Actress award in 1959 Mainichi Film Award, then won Best Actress in 1978 Japan Academy Prize for her role in the film Empire of Passion.

She has also appeared in more than a hundred different Japanese television dramas.

Selected filmography

Films

 My Second Brother (1959) - as Kanako Hori
 Foundry Town (1962) - as a factory worker
 Lady Snowblood (1974) - as Aya Tokunaga
 Empire of Passion (1978) - as Seki
 Kaerazaru hibi (1978)
 Chizuko's Younger Sister (1991)
 Kikujiro (1999) - as a grandmother of Masao
 Taboo (1999) - as Matsu
 Lily Festival (2001) - as Rie Miyano
 Tsuribaka Nisshi 15 (2004) - as Nobuko Fukumoto
 J-Horror Theater Yogen (2004) - as Satoko Mikoshiba
 Kamataki (2005) - as Kariya Sensei
 Wool 100% (2006) - as Kame
 Maiko Haaaan!!! (2007) - as Satsuki
 Glory to the Filmmaker! (2007)
 Ponyo on the Cliff by the Sea (2008) - as Toki (voice actress)
 Cyborg She (2008) - as a grandmother of Jiro
 Departures (2008) - as Tsuyako Yamashita
 20th Century Boys (2008) - as mother of Moroboshi
 Koitanibashi (2011)
 Yuriko, Dasvidaniya (2011) - as Yoshie Chujyo
 The Love and Death of Kaoru Mitarai (2013) - as Kaoru Mitarai
 Tokyo Family (2013) - as Tomiko Hirayama
 When Marnie Was There (2014) - as Nanny (voice actress)
 The Firefly Summers (2016)
 The Book Peddler (2016) - as Tome Miyoshi
 What a Wonderful Family! (2016)
 What a Wonderful Family! 2 (2017)
 Miracles of the Namiya General Store (2017)
 Ajin: Demi-Human (2017) - as Yamanaka
 Destiny: The Tale of Kamakura (2017)
 What a Wonderful Family! 3: My Wife, My Life (2018)
 A Forest of Wool and Steel (2018) - as Kiyo Tomura
 The Landlady (2019)
 Omoide Shashin (2021)
 Hama no Asahi to Usotsuki-domo to (2021) - as Hideko Matsuyama
 Somebody's Flowers (2022)
 Life in Bloom (2022)
 Yudō (2023)
 Ai no Komuragaeri (2023)

Television
 Kaze to Kumo to Niji to (1976) - as Kera
 Tokugawa Ieyasu (1983) - as Nene
 Aguri (1997) - as Masako Hirayama
 The Sniffer (2016)

Honours
Kinuyo Tanaka Award (2002)

References

External links

1935 births
Living people
Japanese film actresses
Actresses from Tokyo
Japanese television actresses